The Shoshone? Formation is a geologic formation in Colorado. It preserves fossils dating back to the Paleogene period.

See also

 List of fossiliferous stratigraphic units in Colorado
 Paleontology in Colorado

References
 

Geologic formations of Colorado
Paleogene stratigraphic units of North America